A list of books and essays about Akira Kurosawa:

Kurosawa, Akira
Akira Kurosawa